The Radha Vallabh Sampradaya is a Vaishnava Hindu denomination which began in 1535 at Vrindavan with the bhakti sant Hith Harivansh Mahaprabhu (1502–1552). Harivansh's views are related to Krishnaism but emphasizes devotion to Radharani as the Supreme Being.

Features

According to the scholar Guy L. Beck, the Radha vallabh sampradaya has the following features, in comparison with Krishnaite traditions.
 Its view on Radha and Krishna differentiates from normative Krishnaite theology. The ultimate Supreme Being is the Devi Radha, the Queen, while her consort Krishna is the penultimate step toward the supreme deity, her most intimate servant.
 The tradition prefers to remain unaffiliated with any classical philosophical positions and previous four major Vaishnavite sampradayas.
 It declines to produce theological and philosophical commentaries, basing on pure bhakti, divine love.
 The founder and followers lived and live as householders and sannyasa is not praised.

Scriptures
The main scriptures of the sampradaya created in regional Braj Bhasha with status of the heaven language.
 Hita-Caurāsī ( Caurāsī Pad) — the eighty-four verses (hymns), the principal work of Hith Harivansh Mahaprabhu.
 Vyāhulau Utsav ke Pad (the Vedding Hymns of Radha and Krishna).

Lineage of Radhavallabh Sampraday 

The Shri Radha Vallabh Temple in Vrindavan, Mathura is a very famous temple of the same preaching. This temple is among the most famous 7 temples of Thakur of Vrindavan including Sri Radhavallabh ji, Shri Govind Dev ji, Shri Bankey Bihari Ji and four others. In this temple, there is no idol of Radharani, but a crown is placed next to Krishna to signify her presence.

The "Present Tikaet Adhyikari"TILKAYAT CEREMONY of Shri Radhavallabh ji Temple is Shri Hit Mohit Maral Goswami and further his son Shri Hit Shobhit lal Goswami and his brother Govind lal Goswami are also taking care of the temple. Shri Radhavallabh ji Temple was founded by Shri Hith Harivansh Mahaprabhu who is worshipped in the adjacent temple of Shri Radhavallabh ji which was earlier Shri Radhavallabh ji's temple but because of Mughal Emperor  Aurangzeb attack on Vrindavan he was shifted to other place and then the new temple was built. The Yugal Darshan of Radhavallabh ji is considered as difficult because of rituals due to which the "patt" gets closed. This temple with Madan teer and Seva kunj with Maharasmandal are held by the Tikaet Adhyaksh and are considered as Shri Radhavallabh ji's property. In this temple Radhastami is celebrated largely which is a festival on the birthday of Shri Radha Rani . The Temple of Shri Radhavallabh lal is also the mighty temple as many people confirmed that The Lord there residing is living power while others feel a real relaxation on having the Yugal Darshan of Radhavallabh ji.

In the lap of nature, in Vrindavan with its cluster of forests and meadows surrounded by the revered river Yamuna, the almighty mingled with the people of the land, making on destination of cast and creed. The purest form of divine love play with Sri Radha displayed by him, opened up the most secluded, rarest and the super most path of "Ras-Bhakti", hitherto unknown to the world.

Shri Radhavallabhlal temple is one of the icons of Vrindavan with extraordinary beauty, building style and wonderful darshans of deity. The Lord is considered as living with unearthly powers. Many people from far away come to seek the darshan of Thakur Ji.

The forces of creation and sustenance, in effect Mother Nature herself, reincarnated around Him as Sri Radha, and her companions. Lord Krishna's haunting flute sweetest melodies was the call of God and followers happily abandoned worldly attachments to serve God and joy in this garden of nature.

The kirtan "Samaj-Gayan" is the Radha-vallabha's collective style of hymn singing by the Hindustani classical music forms, such "dhrupad" and "dhamar".

Notable people 

 Prabodhananda Sarasvati, a Sanskrit poet, sannyasi, saint.
 Shri Hit Mohit Maral Goswami, Tilkayat Adhikari, rasopasna Sewi

See also 
 Govind Dev Ji Temple
 Bankey Bihari Temple
 Radha Raman Temple
 Madan Mohan Temple
Radha Damodar Temple, Vrindavan
Radha Madan Mohan Temple, Vrindavan
Radha Vallabh Temple, Vrindavan

Notes

References

Footnotes

Bibliography

External links
 
 Sri Radha Rani — The Supreme Goddess of Vrindavan 

Krishnaite Vaishnava denominations
Vaishnava sects
Shaktism
Bhakti-era Hindu sects
Bhakti movement
Hinduism in Uttar Pradesh
1535 establishments in India